Héroes del Silencio (Spanish: Heroes of Silence) (well known as Héroes or HDS) was a Spanish rock band from Zaragoza, formed by guitarist Juan Valdivia and singer Enrique Bunbury. The lineup was completed by bassist Joaquín Cardiel and drummer Pedro Andreu. During the 1980s they experienced success around Spain and the Americas, and in various European countries including Germany, Belgium, Switzerland, France, Yugoslavia, and Portugal. They established themselves as one of the major contributors to the Rock en español scene and are considered to be one of the all-time best bands in that genre. Their trademarks are their intricate lyrics, complicated arrangements and precise rhythm. After twelve years and numerous albums, the band broke up in 1996. When the lead singer Enrique Bunbury started a solo project, other members of the band also followed a different musical path. In 2007, as part of a 20-year anniversary celebration and 11 years after their break-up, they organized a 10-concert world tour.

The band's distinctiveness was a very characteristic image with a very particular iconography and symbology, and a music characterized by ambiguous and transcendental lyrics, complicated arpeggios and a solid rhythmic base. Among its influences are William Blake, Charles Baudelaire, Led Zeppelin, and The Cult.

In 2021 Netflix premiered the documentary "Heroes: Silencio and Rock & Roll" which covers the entire history of the band as told by the members.

History

Overview 
Héroes del Silencio started in 1984 as a band named Zumo de Vidrio consisting of Juan Valdivia, his brother Pedro Valdivia and their cousin Javier Guajardo Valdivia. Later Enrique Bunbury joined the line-up. Bunbury was originally a bass player but after Juan Valdivia heard him sing a David Bowie song, Bunbury became the vocalist. Bunbury believed this to be a better change as he preferred to roam around instead of being stationary on stage.

The band changed their name in 1985 to Héroes del Silencio. At first they played in public places and made demo recordings but their breakthrough came when they participated in a music contest in Salamanca and won second place. An EMI producer, Gustavo Montesano, saw the band in the contest and at a later concert in Sala En Bruto, he signed the band.

Their first EP, Héroe de Leyenda, was released in 1987 and sold 30,000 copies. The following year, the album El Mar No Cesa was released, featuring the songs "Mar Adentro", "Agosto" and "El Estanque", and sold 100,000 copies. The supporting tour followed in 1989, documented on the limited edition live album En Directo.

On 10 December 1990, they released Senderos de Traición, their best-selling album with 2 million copies, including 400,000 copies in the first two weeks in Spain alone. The following year they started the tour Senda 91 and released another live album, Senda '91. In 1993 the band released the most important CD in their career, El Espíritu del Vino. 600,000 copies of this album, which was played throughout America, were sold. They followed this with a tour for El Espíritu del Vino. In 1993, Alan Boguslavsky joined the band.

Due to tensions within the band, Héroes del Silencio took a hiatus and went to Benasque to take a vacation and heal the rifts within the group. After this break they acquired a new producer, Bob Ezrin (Lou Reed, Pink Floyd, Peter Gabriel, Alice Cooper, Kiss, etc.) and in 1995 released Avalancha. Avalancha was more hard rock than the previous albums, with songs like "Avalancha", "Deshacer el Mundo" and "Iberia Sumergida". The album was followed by the Avalancha tour in 1995 and 1996, which produced the live album "Para siempre".

The band split in 1996, though this did not stop the release of the album Rarezas in 1998 and El Ruido y la Furia in 2005.

Albums and tours 
In 1988 Héroes recorded their first full-length album. El Mar No Cesa was a limited edition and all copies (30,000) were sold. The album was more pop-oriented than the band had originally wished, which made them perform live in a slightly more aggressive way so as to show the real potential of the band. A limited live album En Directo was later released capturing the energy of their concerts. In 1990 they went into the studio once again to work with producer Phil Manzanera on their second album, Senderos de Traición.

In 1990 Senderos de Traición was a successful second release for Heroes, "combining Celtic guitars [and] metal rhythms." The songs "Entre Dos Tierras" and "Maldito Duende" are still among the most popular of the band. The album was recorded in London, including English versions of "Entre Dos Tierras" and "Maldito Duende". It was decided though to not publish them. The tour for this album was called Senda like the song of the same name. It took the band to America and to various European countries including Germany and Belgium; winning several gold discs on their way. According to Bunbury, the tour represented the golden times of the band. The live album Senda '91 was produced on this tour. When the band gave a concert in Mexico, they met Alan Boguslavsky who would later join the band. Senderos de Traición stayed in the album charts of countries like Spain, Switzerland and Germany.

In 1993, after the success of Senderos de Traición, the band recorded their third album called El Espíritu del Vino which was produced by Phil Manzanera. The singles from the release were "Nuestros Nombres", "Flor de Loto", "Los Placeres De La Pobreza", "La Sirena Varada" and "La Herida" The album features hard rock and has a style similar to rock bands like Led Zeppelin, The Cult, The Mission, Fields of the Nephilim and Guns N' Roses. The songs "Nuestros Nombres" and "La Herida" reached position one in several European charts. Alan Boguslavsky joined the band in the tour named El Camino Del Exceso, during which they played in countries including Germany, Austria, Portugal, Italy, Mexico, Argentina, U.S.A., Chile, Finland and Hungary. The song "Nuestros Nombres" reached the first place in the "40 Principales", being the first song of the band in a number one position. "La Sirena Varada" was the second song of Héroes del Silencio in "Los 40 Principales". The rest of the songs on the album got in the Top 10 of "Los 40 Principales" and on MTV.

"El Camino Del Exceso" meant in many ways the loss of compatibility between Bunbury and Valdivia.

In 1995 Héroes met Bob Ezrin, who produced the album Avalancha. This album was a new commercial success for the Héroes. Alan Boguslavsky, baptized "el Azteca de oro", entered the band officially, being credited as co-composer of several songs although he did not appear in the promotional photos for the album. The album has a stronger rock style than any others before. Songs like "Iberia Sumergida" and "La Chispa Adecuada" came into the first position of the lists. The title track, "Avalancha", came in the first positions of charts like MTV. The tour was the most extensive one of the band. The final concert of Héroes del Silencio was meant to take place in Los Angeles but it was canceled because the crowd was angry at the band after rumors of their split. Héroes said goodbye in Spain with the mythical phrase: "Nos vemos en la gira del proximo milenio. Hasta Siempre [See you on tour in the next millennium. Farewell].".

Breakup and reunion 
At the Avalancha tour, the band participated in the Monsters of Rock of Brasil in 1996 as headliners. The concert was not recorded. The Héroes also got a special in MTV, like Unplugged and Gustock.

The "Tour macrogira Avalancha" from July 1995 to October 1996 led them to give 152 concerts in Europe and America. The coexistence during that time was difficult, and fatigue lead to increased internal conflicts. During this development, Bunbury started his own compositions and recorded new songs, hinting that his future was already far from Héroes del Silencio. Their last concert was in Los Angeles on 6 October 1996.

Before concluding the tour, and in a press conference in Lima, Peru, Héroes del Silencio reported their temporary separation. Apart from its environment, the news was surprising, but eventually came to transcend some of the reasons that had led to such a situation. The musical differences, especially between Juan and Enrique, became personal. The deaths of two persons very close to the group as well influenced the band's morale: their road manager Martin Druille in 1993, and Enrique's brother, Rafael, in 1994. As remarked by Bunbury, the last months of the tour were an ordeal for him.

2007 Reunion tour 

20 years after their first album, and 11 years after they split up, the band announced a ten-day reunion tour that would take them to Guatemala City, Buenos Aires, Monterrey, Ciudad de México, Los Angeles, Sevilla, Zaragoza and Valencia. For this tour guitarist Gonzalo Valdivia (Juan Valdivia's brother) replaced former band member Alan Boguslavsky. More than 20,000 people attended each concert and some of the concerts saw as many as 90,000 fans (e.g. in Valencia, Ricardo Tormo's Stadium). The tour was followed by another live album, Tour 2007. The album came with a 2 DVD that showed the concert at Ciudad de Mexico as well as showing some songs from other concerts like Bendecida in Los Angeles and Flor Venenosa in Monterrey. The other DVD contained a documentary of the group as they traveled through every city during the tour. The deluxe box set included both DVD and CD as well as a backstage pass, some drumsticks, a t-shirt, and 2 posters.

After the tour, singer-songwriter Enrique Bunbury announced his new album, focusing in his solo career.

Discography

Studio albums 
 El Mar No Cesa (1988)
 Senderos de traición (1990)
 El Espíritu del Vino (1993)
 Avalancha (1995)

A special edition of each album was released in 2006 by EMI. Each album includes an additional disc that includes remixes, live versions, and unreleased material

Live recordings 
 En Directo (1989)
 Senda '91 (Las Rozas (Madrid), 26 September 1991)
 Parasiempre (Disc one: Zaragoza, 8 June 1996; Disc two: Madrid, 7 June 1996)
 El Ruido y la Furia La Riviera Madrid, Spain, 20 November 1996 (2005)
 Tour 2007 (2007)
 Live in Germany (2011)

Compilations 
 Rarezas (outtakes and rare versions) (1998)
 Edición del Milenio (4-CD boxset) (1999)
 Canciones 1984–1996 (2-CD set) (2000)
 Antología Audiovisual (2004)
 The Platinum Collection (3 CD, 2 DVD) (2006)
 Héroes: Silence and Rock & Roll (2 CD) (2021)

Singles 
La Lluvia Gris (1988) From El Mar No Cesa
Flor Venenosa" (1988) From El Mar No CesaMar Adentro (1989) From El Mar No CesaNo Mas Lagrimas (1989) From El Mar No CesaFuente Esperanza (1989) From El Mar No CesaAgosto (1989) From El Mar No CesaEntre Dos Tierras (1990) From Senderos de traiciónMaldito Duende (1990) From Senderos de traiciónOración (1991) From Senderos de traciónDespertar (1991) From Senderos de traiciónCon Nombre De Guerra (1991) From Senderos de traiciónLa Sirena Varada (1993) From El Espíritu del VinoLa Herida (1993) From El Espíritu del VinoNuestros Nombres (1993) From El Espíritu del VinoSangre Hirviendo (1993) From El Espíritu del VinoFlor De Loto (1993) From El Espíritu del VinoIberia Sumergida (1995) From AvalanchaDeshacer El Mundo (1995) From AvalanchaLa Chispa Adecuada (1995) From AvalanchaApuesta Por El Rock'n'Roll (1998) From Rarezas(Cover of Más Birras)Morir Todavia (1998) From Rarezas and Avalancha

 Extended plays 
 Héroe de Leyenda (EP) (1987)

 Unreleased albums 
Many of the unreleased albums were live performancesMTV Unplugged (1993)La Primera Avalancha (1996)Rock am Ring MTV (1996)Acoustic (1996)Tour 2007 – Estadio De la Romareda'' (2007)

In other media 
The song "Avalancha" is a bonus song in the video game Guitar Hero III: Legends of Rock.
The song "Hechizo" is featured in the 2017 Netflix horror film, Verónica, and has since gained the band recognition and new fans as a result.

Films 
Music Videos

Mar Adentro – Music Video (1988)

Entre dos Tierras – Music Video (1991)

Maldito Duende – Music Video (1991)

Con nombre de guerra – Music Video (1991)

Nuestros nombres – Music Video (1993)

La Herida – Music Video (1993)

Los placeres de la pobreza – Music Video (1993)

La Sirena Varada – Music Video (1993)

Flor de Loto – Music Video (1993)

Iberia Sumergida – Music Video (1995)

Avalancha – Music Video (1995)

La chispa adecuada – Music Video (1995)

Maldito Duende (Live) – Music Video (1996)

Maldito Duende (Live 1996) is from Parasiempre album
 All the music videos are also included in the compilation album "Antologia Audiovisual"
Documental Gira 96'
 The documentary in "Antologia Audiovisual"
Tour 2007 (2007) (2 DVD)
Mexico D.F concert including encores from other shows, 2nd DVD is documentary
Heroes del Silencio: Estadio de la Romareda (2007)
Zaragoza Day 1 Show from 2007 World Tour – LIMITED EDITION
Tesoro: El ultimo silencio (2007)
 Recorded during the last concert in Valencia as part of the 2007 World Tour – LIMITED EDITION
Documental El Espiritu del Vino 20th anniversary (2013)
Recorded in 1993 and released along 20th anniversary remixed album
Heroes: Silencio and Rock & Roll (2021)
Netflix Documentary and Released along the 2 CD & 2 Vinyl Album

See also 
 Enrique Bunbury
Joaquín Cardiel
Juan Valdivia
 Spanish rock
 Rock en Español

References

External links 

Héroes del Silencio(official website)
Enrique Bunbury (official website)
 NadaBueno – Héroes del Silencio: Spanish Review
 
Héroes del Silencio on Europopmusic.eu (English)

Spanish hard rock musical groups
Spanish gothic rock groups
Rock en Español music groups
Musical groups established in 1984
Musical groups disestablished in 1996
Musical groups reestablished in 2007